This article covers the 2016–17 season for Flamurtari Vlorë. They'll participate in the Kategoria Superiore and Albanian Cup.

Squad

First team squad
Squad at end of season

Transfers

In

Out

Pre-season and friendlies

Competitions

Kategoria Superiore

League table

Results summary

Results by round

Matches

Albanian Cup

First round

Second round

Quarter-finals

References

External links
Soccerway

Flamurtari Vlore
Flamurtari Vlorë seasons